Sarah Goldfinger is an Emmy-winning writer, showrunner, and executive producer for her work on the Netflix series Trinkets. She is co-showrunning Partner Track for Netflix.

Her previous writing credits include Golden Globe-nominated الآنسة فرح, Jane the Virgin, Parenthood, CSI, Brothers & Sisters, Hawaii Five-0, Grimm, Almost Human, Da Vinci's Demons, and the Charmed reboot. She has also developed pilots with CBS, HBO, and Freeform (formerly known as ABC Family).

Early life and education
Sarah grew up in a small town in Pennsylvania. She graduated from Hampshire College with a B.A. in playwriting.

Credits
الآنسة فرح
Partner Track (pre-production)
Trinkets
Charmed 
Jane the Virgin
Almost Human
Da Vinci's Demons
Parenthood
Grimm
Hawaii Five-0
Brothers & Sisters
CSI: Crime Scene Investigation
Two and a Half Men

References

External links
 
 CSI Files - Fansite interview with Sarah Goldfinger
 Article about Sarah Goldfinger

American television producers
American women television producers
American television writers
Hampshire College alumni
American women television writers
Year of birth missing (living people)
Living people
Place of birth missing (living people)
21st-century American women